KRVI (106.7 FM) is a radio station broadcasting an adult hits format. It is licensed to Mount Vernon, Missouri, United States, and serves the Springfield, Missouri area. The station is owned by SummitMedia.

The station first aired in 1994 as KHTO Hot 106.7 "Springfield's Hottest Hits" and aired a Top 40 (CHR) format. The station also used to be KZRQ, known as Z106.7 (previously Channel Z-104.1 Rock This) and had an active rock format. Prior to that, the station was KHTO 106.7 The End "Music For All People".

Journal Communications and the E. W. Scripps Company announced on July 30, 2014 that the two companies would merge to create a new broadcast company under the E.W. Scripps Company name that owned the two companies' broadcast properties, including KRVI. The transaction was completed in 2015, pending shareholder and regulatory approvals. Scripps exited radio in 2018; the Springfield stations went to SummitMedia in a four-market, $47 million deal completed on November 1, 2018.

On October 28, 2020, KRVI dropped its "The River" adult hits format and began stunting with Christmas music, branded as "Santa 106.7". They have since reverted to "The River" branding.

References

External links

RVI
Radio stations established in 1993
1993 establishments in Missouri